The Vovk is a river in Ukraine. Translated into English, the river name means wolf. It flows through the Khmelnytskyi Oblast of western Ukraine and is a right-bank tributary  of the Southern Bug in the Black Sea basin. The Vovk flows through Derazhnya and enters the Southern Bug in Letychiv.

References

Rivers of Khmelnytskyi Oblast